Robert Strobl (born 24 October 1985) is an Austrian footballer who plays for SV Grödig.

External links
 

Austrian footballers
Austrian Football Bundesliga players
SV Grödig players
1985 births
Living people
TSV Hartberg players

Association football defenders
People from Güssing
Footballers from Burgenland